John Stewart Detlie (December 23, 1908 – November 30, 2005) was an American motion picture art director and set designer in Hollywood from 1937 to 1942.

Detlie earned degrees in architecture from the University of Pennsylvania. He was nominated for an Academy Award in 1941 for Best Art Direction for the film Bitter Sweet.

Detlie went on to serve in the Army in World War II, including directing the camouflage of Boeing Plant 2 in Seattle. He went on to a career in architecture, designing Temple de Hirsch Sinai in Seattle and a number of large churches and parts of downtown Honolulu. He was an accomplished artist in water colors, acrylics, and oils.

Family
His brother, Stanley Detlie, was a set designer in the 1930s and 1940s.

Marriages
Detlie was the first husband of actress Veronica Lake, although 14 years older than she; they had two children, one of whom died shortly after birth. They divorced in 1943.

Detlie and his second wife, Virginia Crowell Detlie, with whom he also had two children, lived in La Quinta, California, for 48 years, until his death from lung cancer several weeks before his 97th birthday.

References

External links
 
Washington Post obituary, washingtonpost.com
John Stewart Detlie, Sr. profile, Pacific Coast Architecture Database (digital.lib.washington.edu)

1908 births
2005 deaths
United States Army personnel of World War II
American artists
American art directors
Deaths from lung cancer in California
People from La Quinta, California
People from Sioux Falls, South Dakota
University of Pennsylvania School of Design alumni